Kushk-e Hezar (also Romanized as Kūshk-e Hezār, Kūshk-e Hazār, and Kūshk Hezār; also known as Khushk, Kūshk, and Kūshk-e Hezār Qal‘eh) is a village in Kushk-e Hezar Rural District, Beyza District, Sepidan County, Fars Province, Iran. At the 2006 census, its population was 1,898, in 466 families.

References 

Populated places in Beyza County